Crashing the Ether is the seventh album by Tommy Keene. Recorded at his home studio, Keene played most of the instruments himself; among others, John Richardson played drums and Gin Blossoms guitarist Jesse Valenzuela chipped in with some back-up vocals.

Track listing
All songs written by Tommy Keene
 "Black & White New York" – 4:56
 "Warren in the '60s" – 3:26
 "Quit That Scene" – 3:24
 "Driving Down the Road in My Mind" – 5:28
 "Wishing" – 4:15
 "Lives Become Lies" – 5:08
 "Eyes of Youth" – 3:45
 "I've Heard That Wind Blow Before" – 3:35
 "Alta Loma" – 4:13
 "Texas Tower No.4" – 6:10

Personnel
 Tommy Keene — Vocals, instrumentation

Additional musicians
 Brad Quinn — Bass guitar
 Jesse Valenzuela — Harmony vocals
 Steve Gerlach — Guitar
 Walter Vincent — Harmony vocals
 John Richardson — Drums
 R. Walt Vincent — Harmony vocals

Production
 Tommy Keene — Producer
 Walter Vincent — Producer, mixing
 R. Walt Vincent — Producer, mixing
 Jonathan Pines — Engineer, drum engineering
 Louie Teran — Mastering
 Kevin Lane Keller — Executive producer
 Chris Widmer — Engineer, drum engineering

Additional credits
 Cary Baker — Publicity
 Jim Horan — Art direction
 Steve Curtis — Photography
 Tommy Keene — Photography

References

2006 albums
Tommy Keene albums